Bad Köstritz is a town in the district of Greiz, in Thuringia, Germany. It is situated on the White Elster river, 7 km northwest of Gera. Bad Köstritz is known for the Köstritzer brewery and its Schwarzbier (black beer).

History
The settlement was first mentioned in 1364 as Kostricz, a place of Slavic foundation. There has been a castle since the middle of the 13th century. The city has emerged from two medieval manors.

Within the German Empire (1871–1918), Köstritz was part of the Principality of Reuss-Gera. Köstritz Castle, a four-winged building around a courtyard built between 1687 and 1704, was the seat of a side wing of the ruling House of Reuss, named counts and (from 1806) princes Reuss-Köstritz. The castle was demolished in 1972 under the government of East Germany, with only the gatehouse left. Today, a modern hotel has been built on the site. In January 2023 Bad Köstritz absorbed the former municipality Hartmannsdorf.

Local council
Election in May 2014:
CDU: 9 seats
The Left: 3 seats
Free voters (FWG): 4 seats

Sights
Heinrich Schütz House
Municipal park

Sons and daughters of the town

 Heinrich Schütz (1585–1672), German composer of the early Baroque
 Heinrich IX, Count Reuss of Köstritz (1711–1780), founder of the middle branch family Reuss-Köstritz
 Julius Sturm (1816–1896), important German poet of late Romanticism, pastor in Köstritz 1856–1885, honorary citizen of Köstritz 1885
 Gustav von Hüfner (1840–1908), German chemist
 Heinrich Sturm (1860–1917), German jurist, politician and from 1908 to 1917 mayor of Chemnitz

References

External links
 Landkreis Greiz 

Towns in Thuringia
Greiz (district)
Principality of Reuss-Gera